Sabra Williams, BEM is a British actress and presenter.

Family
Williams was born in London to parents of British, Russian, Romanian, Guyanese and Carib descent.

Early career
Williams started performing at the age of three and became a professional dancer and actress. She starred in several British films, including 'Steffi' in Thin Ice with Ian McKellen and James Dreyfuss, and was a regular face in many British television series including an appearance as Lise Yates  in episode "Thanks for the Memory" of the sci-fi comedy, Red Dwarf.

Presenter
Williams was cast at a very young age as a lead presenter/actress in the top rated live TV show, Ghost Train . After numerous shows and engagements, including the position of Moderator for BAFTA, WGA and SAG, Williams most recently hosted On The Bench on Setanta Sports.

Los Angeles
Williams has been a member of the Actors' Gang (Artistic Dir.Tim Robbins), leading in several shows including Molière's Tartuffe   and appeared in the ABC series, In Justice, playing Sondra, Kyle MacLachlan's love interest, Mission: Impossible III  opposite Tom Cruise as 'Annie Miller',  and Nip/Tuck  among other notable roles.

References

External links

English film actresses
English television actresses
Living people
Actresses from London
British people of Carib descent
British people of Native American descent
English people of Russian descent
English people of Romanian descent
English people of Guyanese descent
English people of West Indian descent
People from Notting Hill
21st-century English actresses
Year of birth missing (living people)